Eric Daian Remedi (born 4 June 1995) is an Argentine professional footballer who plays as a defensive midfielder for Argentine Primera División club Club Atlético Banfield.

Career

Banfield
Remedi's senior career started in 2015 with Argentine Primera División side Banfield, a club who signed him at the age of fifteen after the player had youth spells with Palermo de Paraná and Belgrano de Paraná. His first appearance for the club came on 6 June during a goalless draw against Sarmiento under the guidance of manager Matías Almeyda. On 24 August 2016, Remedi made his Copa Sudamericana debut against San Lorenzo. He remained with El Taladro for three years and made sixty-five appearances in all competitions, with his final appearance arriving on 12 May 2018 during a goalless draw away to Patronato.

Atlanta United
In June 2018, Remedi headed abroad to join Atlanta United of Major League Soccer. He made his debut on 21 July during a home victory against D.C. United. Remedi scored his first senior goal on 4 November, netting for Atlanta during a win over New York City in the MLS Cup Playoffs; which they'd win. His next goal came against Orlando City in a 2019 U.S. Open Cup semi-final, a competition that the club went on to win with Remedi playing the full duration of the final versus Minnesota United at Mercedes-Benz Stadium on 27 August. He departed Atlanta ahead of the 2021 campaign, having scored three goals in seventy-eight games.

San Jose Earthquakes
On 15 February 2021, Remedi was traded to the San Jose Earthquakes in exchange for $200,000 of 2022 General Allocation Money; with the potential to rise to $500,000. The move saw him reunite with Matías Almeyda, who gave Remedi his senior debut back in June 2015 for Banfield. After the 2022 season Remedi's contract option was declined by the Earthquakes, and so he left MLS and returned to Club Atlético Banfield.

Career statistics

Honours
Atlanta United
MLS Cup: 2018
U.S. Open Cup: 2019

References

External links

1995 births
Living people
People from Paraná, Entre Ríos
Argentine footballers
Association football midfielders
Argentine expatriate footballers
Expatriate soccer players in the United States
Argentine expatriate sportspeople in the United States
Argentine Primera División players
Major League Soccer players
Club Atlético Banfield footballers
Atlanta United FC players
San Jose Earthquakes players
Sportspeople from Entre Ríos Province